Brigitte Nijman ,(born 12 July 1970) is a Dutch actress and singer. She has done a lot of theater work such as roles in Ciske de Rat, Pietje Bell de musical and The Sound of Music.

References

Living people
1970 births
Actresses from The Hague
20th-century Dutch women singers
21st-century Dutch women singers
21st-century Dutch singers
20th-century Dutch actresses
21st-century Dutch actresses
Musicians from The Hague